The Test of English for Aviation (T.E.A.) is an language proficiency test designed and developed by Mayflower College in the United Kingdom. 

T.E.A. is accredited by numerous national civil aviation authorities including the UK CAA.

50,000+ aviation specialists have taken T.E.A. in 100+ test centres around the world

Overview
Following several accidents and incidents where language was a contributory factor (viz. ), the International Civil Aviation Organization now requires all civil pilots and Air traffic controllers (working in an international environment) to have a minimum level of English.

Six skills (Vocabulary, Structure, Pronunciation, Fluency, Comprehension, Interactions) are assessed on a scale from 1 to 6 (1 = Pre-Elementary, 6=Expert). The lowest of the 6 scores determines the overall score.
Level 4 (Operational) is the required minimum.
Only speaking and listening skills are assessed.

The test takes the form of a one-to-one interview between the candidate and a trained examiner.

What is the T.E.A. test?

 A test of plain English in an aviation context for licensing purposes – it is not a test of aviation phraseology 
 A test of ability to communicate in English – not a test of operational knowledge 
 A face-to-face, human interaction test with 1 examiner who asks questions for detailed responses 
 A 25-30 minute test that consists of 3 sections: 
 
 Section One: Introduction & Experience-related Interview (7 – 8 minutes)
 Section Two:  Interactive Comprehension (8-12 minutes) - listening to a series of recording of international speakers of English
 Section Three: Picture Description and Discussion (10 minutes)

T.E.A. Ltd. and Plymouth University are the developers of the International Maritime English Testing System (IMETS)

See also
 Aviation English
 English Proficiency Test for Aviation

External links
  Online language proficiency test ( Level4, Level5, Level6 ) for pilots in english or german
 Test of English for Aviation
 Mayflower College
 Aviation English
 Plymouth University
 English for Aviation Courses

English language tests
English-language education
English for specific purposes